"Alone Again" is a song by Canadian singer the Weeknd, from his fourth studio album, After Hours. It was released on March 20, 2020, alongside the rest of the album and serves as the opening track. The Weeknd wrote and produced the song with DaHeala, Illangelo and Frank Dukes.

Critical reception
According to Billboard, "Alone Again" was ranked as the ninth best song from After Hours.

Charts

Personnel
 The Weeknd – vocals, keyboards, programming
 Illangelo – keyboards, programming, engineering, mixing 
 Shin Kamiyama – engineering
 DaHeala – keyboards, programming
 Frank Dukes – keyboards, programming
 Dave Kutch – mastering
 Kevin Peterson – mastering

Release history

References

2020 songs
The Weeknd songs
Songs written by the Weeknd
Song recordings produced by the Weeknd
Songs written by DaHeala
Songs written by Illangelo
Songs written by Frank Dukes
Song recordings produced by Frank Dukes
Song recordings produced by Illangelo